Fábio André Freitas Vianna (born 8 October 1998) is a Portuguese footballer who plays as a defender for Liga I club FC Argeș Pitești.

Football career
He made his professional debut for Académica on 20 September 2020 in the Liga Portugal 2.

References

External links

1998 births
Living people
People from Vila Real, Portugal
Portuguese footballers
Association football defenders
Liga Portugal 2 players
S.C. Braga B players
Liga I players
FC Argeș Pitești players
Associação Académica de Coimbra – O.A.F. players
Sportspeople from Vila Real District
Portuguese expatriate footballers
Portuguese expatriate sportspeople in Romania
Expatriate footballers in Romania